ATI2  may refer to:
 3Dc FourCC code, a lossy data compression algorithm
 RFB ATI-2, the second prototype of the German RFB Fantrainer aircraft